Note, notes, or NOTE may refer to:

Music and entertainment
 Musical note, a pitched sound (or a symbol for a sound) in music
 Notes (album), a 1987 album by Paul Bley and Paul Motian
 Notes, a common (yet unofficial) shortened version of the title of the American TV situation comedy, Notes from the Underbelly
 Notes (film), a short by John McPhail
 Notes (journal), the quarterly journal of the Music Library Association

Finance
 Banknote, a form of cash currency, also known as bill in the United States and Canada
 Promissory note, a contract binding one party to pay money to a second party
 Note, a security (finance), a type of bond

Technology and science
 IBM Notes, (formerly Lotus Notes), a client-server, collaborative application owned by IBM Software Group
 Natural orifice transluminal endoscopic surgery (NOTES), a type of minimally invasive surgery
 Notes (Apple), a note-taking application bundled with macOS and iOS
 Notes, another name for the Japanese video game company Type-Moon
 Samsung Galaxy Note series, an Android phablet
 Redmi Note, a series of mobile phones
 NOTE (tag), a tag used in computer programming
 Microsoft OneNote, a note-taking application bundled with Office

Writing, texts, and documents
 A diplomatic note, or letter of protest, a highly formal diplomatic document
 Note (typography), a commentary or reference appended to a text
 Note-taking, a recording of information
 Note verbale, a diplomatic letter or document, also known as Third Person Note or Third Party Note
 Suicide note

Others
 National Organisation for Tobacco Eradication (India), a campaigning organisation
 Note (perfumery), a scent experienced as a perfume fades
 Nissan Note, a mini MPV produced by Nissan

See also 
 Liner notes
 Notation (disambiguation)
 Note 2 (disambiguation)
 The Note (disambiguation)
 Help:Footnotes